The 2000 Dubai Tennis Championships, also known by its sponsored name Duty Free Dubai Open, was a men's tennis tournaments played on outdoor hard courts at the Aviation Club Tennis Centre in Dubai in the United Arab Emirates that were part of the International Series of the 2000 ATP Tour. The tournament was held from February 7 through February 13, 2000. First-seeded Nicolas Kiefer won the singles title.

Finals

Singles

 Nicolas Kiefer defeated  Juan Carlos Ferrero 7–5, 4–6, 6–3
 It was Kiefer's 1st title of the year and the 5th of his career.

Doubles

 Jiří Novák /  David Rikl defeated  Robbie Koenig /  Peter Tramacchi 6–2, 7–5
 It was Novák's 1st title of the year and the 10th of his career. It was Rikl's 1st title of the year and the 16th of his career.

References

External links
 Official website
 ATP tournament profile
 ITF tournament edition details

 
Dubai Tennis Championships
Dubai Tennis Championships